The Milwaukee Creams were a minor league baseball team based in Milwaukee, Wisconsin. Between 1889 and 1913, the Creams played as members of the 1889 Western Association, Western League from 1902 to 1903 and 1913 Wisconsin-Illinois League. The Western League Creams franchise was forced to fold as the result of a territory dispute between the Western League and American Association. The Creams hosted minor league home games at Borchert Field and Lloyd Street Grounds.

Baseball Hall of Fame member Clark Griffith played for the 1889 Milwaukee Creams and Hall of Famer Hugh Duffy was player/manager of the 1902 and 1903 teams.

History
The Milwaukee Creams began play as members of the 1889 Western Association. The Milwaukee Brewers adopted the Creams moniker for the 1889 season. Some references list other Brewers teams as both the "Brewers" and "Creams" combined in various other seasons. The team finished with a record of 58–63 and placed 5th, playing under manager Ezra Sutton.

Baseball Hall of Fame inductee Clark Griffith pitched for the 1889 Milwaukee Creams at age 19. Griffith had a 23–18 record for Milwaukee, pitching 328 innings.

The 1902 Milwaukee Creams became members of the Class A level Western League. The Creams began play as the second team in Milwaukee, as the Milwaukee Brewers played as members of the American Association. Milwaukee having two Class A franchises at the same time proved to be a tenuous arrangement.

The Milwaukee Creams placed 3rd in the 1902 Western League. Milwaukee ended the season with record of 80–54, finishing 1.0 game behind the 1st place Kansas City Blue Stockings. Milwaukee played under Hall of Famer player/manager Hugh Duffy, who hit .291 in 505 at–bats at age 35. In the 1902 Western League standings, the Milwaukee Creams finished a close 3rd place. The Kansas City Blue Stockings (82–54) finished mere percentage points ahead of the 2nd place Omaha Indians (84–56), followed closely by the Milwaukee Creams (80–54). They were followed by the Denver Grizzlies (81–57), St. Joseph Saints (71–68), Colorado Springs Millionaires (63–75), Des Moines Midgets (54–83) and Peoria Distillers (35–103) in the final standings.

The 1903 Milwaukee Creams won the Western League Championship and were forced to fold following the season. Milwaukee finished with a record of 83–43 under returning player/manager Hugh Duffy, who hit .300 in 75 games. The Creams finished 8.0 games ahead of the 2nd place Colorado Springs Millionaires, with Kansas City Blue Stockings in 3rd place, 18.0 games behind the 1st place Milwaukee Creams.

After the 1903 season, the American Association and Western League negotiated territory rights, as both were Class A level minor leagues, the highest level of minor leagues. As a result, two Western League franchises were negatively affected. The Kansas City Blues remained in Kansas City and the Kansas City Blue Stockings were forced to permanently fold the franchise. Relatedly, Milwaukee also had the exact situation and the Milwaukee Creams of the Western League were also forced to fold their franchise, with the Milwaukee Brewers continuing in the Class A American Association and the Western League also continuing play remaining as a Class A league in 1904.>

In 1913, the Milwaukee Creams played briefly in the Class C level Wisconsin-Illinois League. The team was owned by Charles Moll, the previous president Wisconsin–Illinois League and Milwaukee was chosen as a replacement for the Aurora Blues in the league, which led to legal action by Aurora owners. Milwaukee, nicknamed the "Mollys" by local newspapers, opened their Wisconsin-Illinois League season on Wednesday, April 30, 1913, at Athletic Park, with Milwaukee Mayor Gerhard Bading throwing out the first pitch. Approximately 400 attended as Milwaukee defeated the Appleton Papermakers 12–5. On June 28, 1913, the Creams were suffering from low attendance, as fans also were drawn to semi–pro Kosciuszko Reds and Milwaukee Brewers games. The Creams had a 28–20 record when the franchise relocated to Fond du Lac, Wisconsin and finished the season as the Fond du Lac Molls. At the end of the season the Milwaukee/Fond du Lac team finished in 5th place with a 63–60 overall record, 13.0 games behind the 1st place Oshkosh Indians, playing under managers Harry Clark, Ernest Landgraf and Marty Hogan. The "Molls" moniker was in reference to team owner Charles Moll, who was a Milwaukee resident and president of the American Grinder Company.

The ballparks

The Milwaukee Creams played 1889 and 1913 minor league home games at Borchert Field. Then known as Athletic field, the ballpark was named after owner Otto Borchert and later sold by the Borchert family in 1952 to make way for an interstate. The site is now part of I-43 between 7th Street and 8th Street, Milwaukee, Wisconsin.

In 1902 and 1903, the Milwaukee Creams hosted home games at the Lloyd Street Grounds. After the Milwaukee Creams were folded, the ballpark was demolished in 1904. The Lloyd Street Grounds were located on West Lloyd Street between North 16th Street & North 18th Street, Milwaukee, Wisconsin.

Timeline

Year–by–year records

Notable alumni

Baseball Hall of Fame alumni
Hugh Duffy (1902-1903, MGR) Inducted, 1945
Clark Griffith (1889) Inducted, 1946

Notable alumni
Doc Adkins (1902)
Gus Alberts (1889)
George Bone (1902)
Jack Bracken (1902)
Jim Cockman (1902–1903)
George Davies (1889)
Howard Earl (1889)
Mutz Ens (1913)
Happy Felsch (1913)
Julie Freeman (1889)
Frank Gatins (1902–1903)
Bob Hall (1903)
Bill Hassamaer (1889)
Joseph Herr (1889)
Jerry Hurley (1889)
Ed Keas (1889)
Ed Kenna (1902–1903)
Ed Knouff (1889)
Gus Krock (1889)
Glenn Liebhardt (1902)
Bobby Lowe (1889)
John McPherson (1902–1903)
Kohly Miller (1902–1903)
Tom Morrissey (1889)
Jack O'Brien (1902)
John O'Neill (1903)
Tom Poorman (1889)
Jack Sheehan (1913)
George Shoch (1889)
Earl Smith (1913)
George Stone (1903) 1906 AL batting champion
Ezra Sutton (1889, MGR)
Len Swormstedt (1902–1903)
John Thornton (1902–1903)
Farmer Vaughn (1902)
Paul Wachtel (1913)
Joe Wall (1902)

See also
 Milwaukee Creams players
 History of professional baseball in Milwaukee

References

External links
Milwaukee - Baseball Reference

Defunct minor league baseball teams
Defunct Western League teams
Baseball teams established in 1889
Baseball teams disestablished in 1913
Defunct baseball teams in Wisconsin
Wisconsin State League teams
Defunct Western Association teams
Baseball in Milwaukee